The , also known as "the three most famous gardens in Japan" are considered to include Kenroku-en in Kanazawa, Kōraku-en in Okayama and Kairaku-en in Mito.

The conception of gardens in a group of three is found elsewhere, for example, in the three gardens of Emperor Go-Mizunoo, who abdicated in 1629. At Shugakuin Imperial Villa, Go-Mizunoo maintained landscaped areas at separate elevations on the northeastern outskirts of Kyoto.

Kenroku-en 

"Garden which combines six characteristics" – the six aspects considered important in the notion of an ideal garden: spaciousness, serenity, venerability, scenic views, subtle design, and coolness.

Kōraku-en 

"Garden of pleasure after", which is a reference to a saying attributed to Confucius—explaining that a wise ruler must attend to his subjects' needs first, and only then should he consider his own interests.

Kairaku-en 

"A garden to enjoy with people." Nariaki Tokugawa, who completed the garden, opened this private garden to the general populace.  This was a novel concept which eventually led to the development of public parks.

See also

 Three Views of Japan
Tourism in Japan

Notes

References

 Bornoff, Nicholas. (2008). National Geographic Traveler Japan. Washington, D.C.: National Geographic Society.  
 Japan Society of London. (1989). Proceedings, Issues 112-120. London: Japan Society of London.

External links

 Kenroku-en official website
 Japan Atlas: Kenrokuen
 Okayama Korakuen Garden official site 
Kairaku-en official website 

Gardens in Japan